A cordon bleu or schnitzel cordon bleu is a dish of meat wrapped around cheese (or with cheese filling), then breaded and pan-fried or deep-fried. Veal or pork cordon bleu is made of veal or pork pounded thin and wrapped around a slice of ham and a slice of cheese, breaded, and then pan-fried or baked. For chicken cordon bleu, chicken breast is used instead of veal. Ham cordon bleu is ham stuffed with mushrooms and cheese.

Name
The French term  is translated as "blue ribbon". According to Larousse Gastronomique, the  "was originally a wide blue ribbon worn by members of the highest order of knighthood, L'Ordre des chevaliers du Saint-Esprit, instituted by Henri III of France in 1578. By extension, the term has since been applied to food preparation to a very high standard and by outstanding cooks. The analogy no doubt arose from the similarity between the sash worn by the knights and the ribbons (generally blue) of a cook's apron."

History
The origins of cordon bleu as a schnitzel filled with cheese are in Brig, Switzerland, probably about the 1940s, first mentioned in a cookbook from 1949. The earliest reference to "chicken cordon bleu" in The New York Times is dated to 1967, while similar veal recipes are found from at least 1955.

Variants

There are many variations of the recipe involving cutlet, cheese, and meat. A popular way to prepare chicken cordon bleu is to butterfly cut a chicken breast, place a thin slice of ham inside, along with a thin slice of a soft, easily melted cheese. The chicken breast is then rolled into a roulade, coated in bread crumbs, and then deep-fried. Other variations exist with the chicken baked rather than fried.

Other common variations include omitting the bread crumbs, wrapping the ham around the chicken, or using bacon in place of ham.

A variant popular in the Asturias province of Spain is cachopo, a deep-fried cutlet of veal, beef or chicken wrapped around a filling of Serrano ham and cheese. In Spain, a version made usually with just two slices of ham and cheese, although it can also be found with chicken or pork loin added, is often called san jacobo.

A common variant in Uruguay and Argentina is the milanesa rellena. It consists of two beef or chicken fillets passed through beaten egg, later, stuffed with cooked ham and mozzarella cheese and superimposed like a sandwich. Once this is done, they are again passed through beaten eggs and breadcrumbs, to be fried or baked. It is usually served with papas fritas (French fries) as a garnish.

In largely Muslim-populated countries, halal versions of chicken cordon bleu are also popular: the chicken is rolled around beef or mutton instead of pork product.

See also

 Culinary Heritage of Switzerland
 Chicken Kiev
 Karađorđeva šnicla
 Dishes à la Maréchale
 Breaded cutlet
 List of stuffed dishes
 Double Down (sandwich)

References

American chicken dishes
French cuisine
Swiss cuisine
Breaded cutlets
Chicken dishes
Pork dishes
Veal dishes
Culinary Heritage of Switzerland
Culinary terminology
Baked foods
Stuffed dishes